Barent Philip Staats (September 25, 1796 – ?) was the mayor of Albany, New York. Staats ran as a Democrat and defeated John Townsend (Whig) by 336 votes in 1842. The next year he doesn't run for reelection, and Friend Humphrey (Whig) defeated Peter Gansevoort by 226 votes.

During the 57th New York State Legislature from January 1 – December 31, 1834 he was a Jacksonian Assemblyman. He was a doctor.

Philip S. Staats, son of Joachim and Elizabeth (Schuyler) Staats, was born July 26, 1755 and married Annetje Van Alstyne (baptized January 13, 1762). He lived on Staats Island, Rensselaer County, and his fourth child was Barent P. Staats.

Staats married Maria Gourlay. His second wife was Maria Ann Winne and his third wife was Caroline Porter. He is buried at Albany Rural Cemetery in Menands, New York.

References

1796 births
Year of death missing
Mayors of Albany, New York
American people of Dutch descent